The Courage to Be Ourselves is a Christmas 1970 pastoral letter of Melkite Catholic Archbishop Joseph Tawil of the Eparchy of Newton. The address defines the raison d'etre for the existence of diasporate Eastern Catholic Churches and their traditions.

Tawil was assigned archbishop of the Meklite Greek Catholic Church in the United States in 1969. Latin practices, particularly the liturgical latinisation of Eastern Catholic liturgies, and thus many Melkite Catholics had abandoned their religion. Tawil wrote the pastoral letter to address these concerns.

The four arguments
Archbishop Tawil used the letter to lay out four major points on the current state and future direction of the Melkite Church in America.
 The patrimony of the Melkite Church is rich in heritage and should not be neglected.  Quoting from Vatican II, the letter says:

 The Eastern Churches have a special mission to the Church of Rome. Tawil mentioned that the Roman Catholic Church has learned much from the Eastern Churches, stating:

 The Eastern Catholic Churches serve as an ecumenical "bridge" between Catholicism and the Orthodox Church. Tawil argued that Latinizing the Eastern Catholic Churches would ultimately block a much hoped-for reunion of Eastern and Western Christianity by demonstrating that a union with Rome would lead to "ecclesiastical assimilation".
 The Melkite faithful living in the diaspora must navigate a course between the twin dangers of what Tawil calls "the ghetto mentality" on the one hand and assimilation. Addressing the facilicy of the ghetto, Tawil argued that the church must be opened up to outsiders:

Legacy and influence
The pastoral letter served as a catalyst for profound changes in the Melkite Church in the United States, and for other Eastern Catholic eparchies located in the West. The most noteworthy effect was the de-Latinization of American churches and a revival of ancient Byzantine traditions. Publication of the letter also facilitated ecumenical movements, including dialogue with the Orthodox Church of Antioch.

In his retirement, Tawil began expanding the pastoral letter into a small book. However, he took ill and died prior to editing and publishing the work.

Notes

See also
Liturgical Latinisation
Orientalium Ecclesiarum

External links
"The Courage to be Ourselves" on the Eparchy's Official Site

Melkite Greek Catholic Church in the United States
Open letters